Aneta Stankiewicz (born 10 February 1995) is a Polish sports shooter. She competed in the women's 10 metre air rifle event at the 2020 Summer Olympics.

References

External links
 

1995 births
Living people
Polish female sport shooters
Olympic shooters of Poland
Shooters at the 2020 Summer Olympics
Place of birth missing (living people)
Sportspeople from Bydgoszcz
Medalists at the 2019 Summer Universiade
Universiade medalists in shooting
Universiade gold medalists for Poland
21st-century Polish women